Steffen Blochwitz (born 8 September 1967) is a German former road and track cyclist. He was part of the East German team that won a silver medal in the 4000 m team pursuit and the 1988 Summer Olympics. Between 1986 and 1989 he won four medals in the individual and team pursuit at world championships.

As a road racer, he won two stages of the Olympia's Tour in 1987 and one in 1989. He won the Sachsen Tour in 1991, OZ Wielerweekend in 1993 and Thüringen Rundfahrt der U23 in 1995.

Major results
1987
 1st Stages 5b (ITT) & 6 Olympia's Tour
1988
 1st Stages 1b (ITT) & 7b (ITT) Niedersachsen-Rundfahrt
1989
 1st Prologue (ITT) Olympia's Tour
1991
 1st Overall Sachsen Tour
1993
 1st Overall OZ Wielerweekend
1st Stage 2
1994
 3rd Overall Course de la Solidarité Olympique
1995
 1st Overall Thüringen Rundfahrt
 1st Stage 6 Niedersachsen-Rundfahrt
1997
 1st Stage 9 Peace Race

References

1967 births
Living people
People from Herzberg (Elster)
People from Bezirk Cottbus
German male cyclists
East German male cyclists
Cyclists from Brandenburg
Olympic cyclists of East Germany
Olympic silver medalists for East Germany
Cyclists at the 1988 Summer Olympics
Olympic medalists in cycling
Medalists at the 1988 Summer Olympics
Recipients of the Patriotic Order of Merit in silver